Severe Tropical Cyclone Kina was a significant tropical cyclone which became the second-costliest storm to ever hit Fiji, only after Cyclone Winston of 2016. Total losses from Kina are estimated to be near . The system was first noted as a tropical depression, to the east of the Solomon Islands on December 23. Over the next few days the system moved south-eastwards and gradually developed further, before it was named Kina, after it had developed into a tropical cyclone during December 26.

Meteorological history

During the middle of December 1992, an active phase of the Madden–Julian oscillation combined with a low-level equatorial surge and an upper-level ridge of high pressure, to provide favourable conditions for the development of several circulations within the monsoon trough. During December 26, the Fiji Meteorological Service (FMS) started to issue gale warnings on one of the circulation and classified it as a tropical depression, while it was located just to the east of the Solomon Islands. During that day, as the depression started to develop further, the United States Joint Typhoon Warning Center initiated advisories on the system and designated it as Tropical Cyclone 07P. At this time, the system appeared to be moving south-southeastwards, however, the FMS thought that the system posed a threat to Vanuatu and started to issue special weather bulletins for the island nation. The system continued to develop during December 27, before it was named Kina by the FMS, after it had become a category 1 tropical cyclone on the Australian tropical cyclone intensity scale. The system subsequently continued to develop as it moved south-eastwards away from Vanuatu and environmental conditions became more favourable with a warm spot appearing on satellite imagery during December 28.

During December 29, the JTWC reported that Cyclone Kina had reached its peak intensity with 1-minute sustained wind speeds of 220 km/h (140 mph), which made the system equivalent to a category 4 hurricane on the SSHWS. At around the same time TCWC Nadi also reported that the system had reached its initial peak intensity, with 10 - minute sustained wind speeds of 150 km/h (90 mph) which made it a category 3 severe tropical cyclone on the Australian scale. The system subsequently remained at its peak intensity until early on December 31, when it start to weaken and move eastwards towards the Yasawa island group. During the next day as the system approached the Northern Yasawa islands, Kina turned sharply towards the southeast, which made it pass between Fiji's two main islands of Viti Levu and Vanua Levu.

Preparations and impact
Severe Tropical Cyclone Kina impacted the island nations of Fiji and Tonga, while it also threatened Vanuatu during its developing stages. Kina was one of the most destructive tropical cyclones to affect Fiji, with parts of the archipelago experiencing the full brunt of a cyclone, for the first time in twenty years. Fiji also suffered its second-greatest ever financial loss from a tropical cyclone, as a result of Kinas strange track through the island nation. The only cyclone to cause more damage in Fiji was Winston of February 2016. Due to the impact of this system, the name Kina was subsequently retired, from the list of names for the region by the World Meteorological Organization.

The systems rain bands started to impact the island nation during December 28, and over the next few days produced torrential rainfall throughout the archipelago. Strong winds were observed in the islands during January 1 and gradually increased to hurricane force over the next few days, as the system passed virtually through the middle of Fiji. As a result, most parts of the archipelago suffered moderate to severe damage was recorded, while 23 people were killed in Fiji by Kina mostly as a result of drowning and being struck by flying objects.

Tonga
During the next day as Kina moved more towards the south-southeast than had been expected, a hurricane warning was issued for Tongatapu, while a storm warning was issued for Haʻapai. The FMS subsequently downgraded the warnings to gale force as the system moved rapidly towards the south, before all warnings were cancelled early on January 4. Within the islands major damage was confined to the Tongatapu group where the system caused a moderate amount of damages, with severe damage reported to food crops while a minimal amount of damage was reported to dwellings. Within Nuku'alofa two people drowned, while another person was electrocuted.

Wallis and Futuna
In conjunction with Kina, Nina affected Wallis and Futuna between January 3–4, however, there were no tropical cyclone warnings were issued for the French Territory by the FMS. Within the islands some damage to crops and houses was reported.

Tuvalu
After Severe Tropical Cyclone Joni had affected Tuvalu during the previous month, Nina and Kina indirectly impacted the island nation during the opening days of January 1993. The systems contributed to the strength of the westerly winds that were already present over the islands, with winds of up to  reported throughout the islands. As a result, damage was reported to crops and several buildings in the island nation, including thirty houses. The Vaitupu Fisheries Harbour, that had only just been built during 1992, was seriously damaged by waves attributed to the two cyclones.

On the island of Nanumea, a poorly designed sea wall trapped the storm surge on the island, which caused salt water contamination of the island vegetation and killed several trees. The An appeal for international assistance was subsequently made by the Government of Tuvalu, as supplied of food and other essentials like petrol and kerosene on the worst affected islands were running low. The European Commission also provided emergency aid to Tuvalu which enabled the Red Cross, to provide foodstuffs, shelter, medical supplies and utensils to people whose homes were destroyed.

See also
Cyclone Evan

References

External links

Category 3 South Pacific cyclones
Tropical cyclones in Fiji
Tropical cyclones in Tonga
Retired South Pacific cyclones
Tropical cyclones in Vanuatu